Polygamy is legal in Indonesia, the largest Muslim population in the world. Polygamy in Indonesia is not just practiced by Muslims, but also customarily done by non-Muslim minorities, such as the Balinese and the Papuans.
 
A Muslim man may take up to four wives. As allowed by Islam, a man may take more than one wife as long as he treats them equally and can financially support them all. Despite such religious legality, polygamy has faced some of the most intense opposition in Indonesia of any Muslim majority nation. Recent restrictions have brought about harsher penalties for unlawfully contracted polygamous unions and polygamy is said to be on the decline. Indonesian military personnel are only permitted to practice polygamy if their religion allows it. Additionally, he must prove to the government that his first wife is unable to carry out her duties as a wife. 

Polygamy under Balinese Hinduism is sanctioned and unrestricted, but the marriage is regulated by adat (traditional customs). Although polygamous marriages are practiced in Bali, the nature of Hindu polygamy has not been included in the national marriage law debates. The native inhabitants of West Papua and Papua have been practicing polygamy long before the arrival of Christian missionaries. The Papuans who choose to still practice polygamous marriages after being Christians usually conduct the adat marriages instead of the church one.

On a separate note, a feminist group published a list of potentially polygamous in hopes of reducing female votes in those politicians.

Restrictions on civil servants 
Indonesian civil servants are restricted from performing polygamy.

Call for complete ban on polygamy 
In late April 2008, a rally of Indonesian women led a protest against the nation's laws allowing for polygamy and polygamous marriages; urging the government to enact a complete ban over such marriages. Male Indonesian politicians were found to be largely opposed, and such a ban has yet to take place.

References

External links 
 "Test of Tolerance", a 2018 episode of Channel NewsAsia's Deciphering Indonesia television series in which journalist Cheryl Marella interviews the members of a polygamous Muslim family

Society of Indonesia
Indonesia